Allen "AJ" Seals (born March 9, 2000) is an American soccer player who plays as a midfielder for Central Florida Panthers SC in the National Premier Soccer League.

Career
Seals played with Orlando City academy team before joining Orlando's United Soccer League side in 2017 as an amateur player.

In 2019, Seals signed with National Premier Soccer League side Central Florida Panthers SC ahead of the team's inaugural season.

References

External links
US Soccer bio

2000 births
Living people
American soccer players
Orlando City B players
Association football midfielders
Soccer players from Orlando, Florida
USL Championship players
National Premier Soccer League players
United States men's youth international soccer players
NC State Wolfpack men's soccer players
UCF Knights men's soccer players